Vladimir Sergeyevich Shkolnik (born 17 February 1949) is a Kazakhstani politician who served as the Minister of Industry and Trade in the Government of Kazakhstan until Galym Orazbakov replaced him on 10 January 2007 in a political shakeup. He served as the Minister of Energy and Mineral Resources in 2005.

While serving as the Energy Minister, Shkolnick co-chaired the 2005 Indo-Kazakh Joint Business Council meeting in Astana with Indian petroleum minister Mani Shankar Aiyar. The Times of India reported that the meeting significantly helped to warm India-Kazakhstan relations after the Government of India tried unsuccessfully to gain the right to develop petroleum in the Kurmangazy field.

Shkolnik served a second term as the minister of energy to 27 March, 2016, when Kanat Bozumbayev's term started.

See also
Government of Kazakhstan

References

External links
Kazakhstan: Government pushing nuclear power despite public fears

1949 births
Living people
Energy in Kazakhstan
Government ministers of Kazakhstan
Kazakhstani people of Russian descent
Ministers of Energy (Kazakhstan)
Deputy Prime Ministers of Kazakhstan